Route 960 is a Canadian highway in Westmorland County, New Brunswick.

Route description
The 26 kilometre road runs from an intersection with Route 16 at Timber River (near Port Elgin) to an intersection with the Immigrant Road (the former Route 16 alignment) in Cape Tormentine.

The road continues as Route 955.

Route 960 serves the communities of Bayside, Upper Cape, and Cape Spear as well as Cape Tormentine.

See also
List of New Brunswick provincial highways

References

New Brunswick provincial highways
Roads in Westmorland County, New Brunswick